Moncton is a civil parish in Westmorland County, New Brunswick, Canada.

For governance purposes it is divided between the cities of Dieppe and Moncton; the village of Salisbury; the Indian reserves of Metepenagiag 3 Urban Reserve, Metepenagiag 8 Urban Reserve, and Soegao 35; and the local service district of the parish of Moncton, which further includes the special service areas of Calhoun Road, Greater Lakeburn, Irishtown, and Painsec Junction.

All governance units except the Indian reserves are members of the Southeast Regional Service Commission.

Origin of name
The parish was named in honour of Robert Monckton, the British commander who captured Fort Beauséjour and oversaw the Expulsion of the Acadians.

History
Moncton was established in 1765 as Monckton Township in the province of Nova Scotia.

In 1786 Moncton Parish was erected as one of the province's original parishes, using the same boundaries as Monckton Township. The northern corner of the parish extended past the northern line of Westmorland County.

In 1835 all of Dorchester Parish north of the mouth of Fox Creek was transferred to Moncton.

In 1850 the western boundary was changed to match the prolongation of the eastern line of a large grant straddling the Petitcodiac River, adding part of Salisbury Parish.

In 1894 the boundary with Dorchester Parish was altered slightly, adding territory to Moncton. The boundaries of the parish were made retroactive to its erection.

Boundaries
Moncton Parish is bounded:

 on the north by the Kent County line;
 on the east beginning on the county line about 150 metres east of Route 115, at the prolongation of the northeastern line of a grant to Martin Walsh on the north side of Route 134, then southeasterly along the prolongation, along the Walsh grant, which runs along the southwestern side of Marshall Road, and along the southeasterly prolongation about 12 kilometres past Route 134 to a point about 1.3 kilometres east of the Memramcook River;
 on the south by the prolongation of a line running south 83º 45' east from the southern side of the mouth of Fox Creek, then by the Petitcodiac River;
 on the west by the western line of the Second Tract granted to Joshua Geldart, about 200 metres upriver of the mouth of the Little River, and the north-northwesterly prolongation of the Geldart line to Kent County.

Communities
Communities at least partly within the parish; bold indicates an incorporated municipality or Indian reserve; italics indicate a name no longer in official use

  Allison (partly in Moncton)
  Ammon
  Berry Mills
  Boundary Creek
 Canaan (Canaan Station)
  Cape Breton
 Catamount
  Dieppe
 Chartersville
 Fox Creek
 Lakeburn
 Saint-Anselme
  Gallagher Ridge
  Greater Lakeburn
  Indian Mountain
  Irishtown
  Lakeville
 LeBlancville
  Lutes Mountain
  Lutesville
 McQuade
  Meadow Brook
 Melanson Settlement
 New Scotland
  O'Neil
  Pacific Junction
  Painsec (partly in Dieppe)
  Painsec Junction
  Salisbury
 Scotch Settlement
 Shaw Brook
 Soegao 35
  Steeves Mountain
  Stilesville
 The Gorge
 Moncton
 Buctouche Junction
  Cherryfield
 Cooks Brook
  Harrisville
 Hildegarde
  Humphrey
 Humphreys Mills
  Lewisville
 Magnetic Hill (Moncton)
 Mapleton, Moncton
 Marsh Junction
 McKinnon
 Odlum Junction
  Tankville

Bodies of water
Bodies of water at least partly in the parish:

 Buctouche River
  East Branch Canaan River
 Cocagne River
 North River
 Petitcodiac River
 Babineau Creek
 Butler Creek
 Fox Creek
 Halls Creek
 Intervale Creek
 Island Creek
  Jonathan Creek
 Lake Creek
 Michaels Creek
 Somers Creek
 Aero Lake
 Irishtown Road Reservoir
 Jones Lake
 McLaughlin Road Reservoir
 Melanson Settlement Lake

Other notable places
Parks, historic sites, and other noteworthy places in the parish.
 Canaan River Wildlife Management Area
 Greater Moncton Roméo LeBlanc International Airport
  Magic Mountain
 Magnetic Hill Zoo
  Moncton/McEwen Airport

Demographics
Parish population total does not include city of Moncton, Soegao 35 Indian reserve, and portions in Dieppe and Salisbury

Population

Language
Mother tongue (2016)

Access routes
Highways and numbered routes that run through the parish, including external routes that start or finish at the parish limits:

Highways

Principal Routes

Secondary Routes:

External Routes:
None

See also
List of parishes in New Brunswick

Notes

References

Parishes of Westmorland County, New Brunswick
Communities in Greater Moncton
Local service districts of Westmorland County, New Brunswick